The Lake County Superior Courthouse was the original building for the superior court of Lake County, located in northwest Indiana. It was built in 1903 in downtown Hammond, Indiana by architect Joseph Tristan Hutton. The courthouse was located on the corner of Hohman Avenue and Rimbach Street. It was demolished in 1974, to be replaced with a parking lot.

References

External links
 

Hammond, Indiana
Buildings and structures in Lake County, Indiana
Demolished buildings and structures in Indiana
Former courthouses in the United States
Government buildings completed in 1903
Buildings and structures demolished in 1974